Lucie Fialová (born 22 July 1988 in Prague) is a professional squash player who represents Czech Republic. She reached a career-high world ranking of World No. 35 in October 2011.

References

External links 

Czech female squash players
Sportspeople from Prague
Living people
1988 births